Hannes Obreno (born 8 March 1991 in Bruges) is a Belgian rower. He competed in the single scull event at the 2016 Summer Olympics.

External links
 
 Hannes Obreno profile at Sports-Reference

1991 births
Living people
Belgian male rowers
Olympic rowers of Belgium
Rowers at the 2016 Summer Olympics
Sportspeople from Bruges
21st-century Belgian people